Chuka University is a public university in the Tharaka Nithi County, Kenya. The university is situated approximately 186 km from Nairobi along the Nairobi-Meru highway, in a rural setting on the eastern slopes of Mt. Kenya at an altitude of approximately 2,000 meters above sea level. Chuka University is within Chuka/Igamba-ng'ombe Constituency, Tharaka-Nithi County.

Establishment 
Chuka University is a public institution established through a legal notice No. 161 of 2007. It was a constituent College of Egerton University and the successor of the former Egerton University Eastern Campus College, Chuka. The Campus College was established on 27 September 2004, by Egerton University Council to enhance access to high quality and affordable University education to the people living in the Eastern region and Kenya at large.

His Excellency President Mwai Kibaki appointed the first Council of the university on 12 September 2008. A prominent businessman, Wilfred Murungi was appointed the first Chairman of Chuka University Council.

The University College was initially established as a Campus of Chuka University in September 2015.

Chuka University was the first institution of higher learning to be established in Eastern Province. The government's objective of establishing the institution was to enhance education access and equity to the people in the region and Kenya at large. This is after the government realized that Education leads to better economic, social and political governance and is a catalyst for transforming Kenya into an industrialized middle-income nation as envisaged in Vision 2030.

Campuses 
Main Campus (Chuka)
 Igembe Campus
 Embu Campus
 Chogoria Campus
 Tharaka Campus
 Town Campus
 Egerton campus (Nairobi CBD)

Leadership 
Prof. Erastus Njoka is the University Vice Chancellor assisted by two DVCs, two Registrars and a Finance Officer in exercising the university mandate. Students are led by the Chuka University Students Association (CUSA) elected by the students at the beginning of every year, currently led by the chairperson Oscar Kipchumba..

Student life
Students enjoy easy access to Chuka Town that is just about 1 km away and the development of Ndagani market makes it easier access to socio-economic services. The student center is almost ready with recreational facilities such as swimming pool. Construction of new student hostels is ongoing, in addition to available housing outside the main campus.

Faculties
Agriculture and Environmental Studies

 Animal Science
 Plant Science
 Agricultural Economic Agribusiness and Agricultural Education
 Environmental Studies and Resource Development

Education and Resources Development

 Education

Business Studies

 Business Administration
 Management Science

Arts and Humanities

 Social Science
 Humanity

Engineering, Science, and Technology

 Biological Sciences
 Physical Sciences
 Computer Science & ICT

School of Law

School of Nursing

External links
 
Chuka University College on Kenyaplex

References

 Chuka University official page

Universities in Kenya
Educational institutions established in 2004
2004 establishments in Kenya